drakconf, or the Mandriva Control Center, is a computer program written in Perl for the configuration of Mandriva Linux, a Linux distribution. It is a tool that allows easy configuration of Mandriva.
It is licensed under the open-source GNU General Public License.

It is also used by Mageia, a fork of Mandriva, where it is called Mageia Control Center.

It is part of the so-called drakxtools and is specifically designed for this Linux distribution for running under command-line or X Window System environment. However the source code is available, so it could be ported to other distributions. This tool is a key feature in Mandriva Linux because it puts many configuration tools together in one place, and it is easier for a user who is new to Linux for configuring their system instead of changing configuration files using a text editor.

References 

 Online Help of the Program by the Mandriva Documentation Team
 Mandriva Control Center on Mandriva Wiki 

Free software programmed in Perl
Linux package management-related software
Mandriva Linux